What's the Deal may refer to:
Trump: What's the Deal?, American documentary film screened in 1991 and released in 2015
"What's the Deal?" (Beavis and Butt-head), episode of animated television series Beavis and Butt-Head